Raymond L. Heacock (January 9, 1928 – December 20, 2016) was an American engineer who spent his career at NASA's Jet Propulsion Laboratory where he worked on the Ranger program in the 1960s and on the Voyager program in the 1970s and 1980s. A Caltech engineering graduate, he was the winner of the James Watt International Medal for 1979.

Education and work
Heacock joined the Jet Propulsion Laboratory in 1953, after receiving his Master of Science Degree in Engineering from the California Institute of Technology. Prior to joining the Voyager Project in 1972 as Spacecraft Systems Manager he had advanced through various positions of responsibility at the Laboratory. In October 1977, he was appointed Deputy Manager of the Voyager Project and became Manager in 1979. He was a member of the American Institute of Aeronautics and Astronautics and has served as Secretary, Treasurer, Vice-President and President of the Board of Directors of the Caltech Alumni Association. Heacock is a native of Santa Ana, California and now lives in La Crescenta.

Since the inception of the Voyager Project in 1972, Heacock was deeply involved in guiding and shaping the successful development and operation of the sophisticated craft. The scientific data from the flight experiments carried aboard them have yielded startling new information on Jupiter, Saturn, and Uranus. Heacock was a leader in the design, development and flight operations of these craft as well as of their scientific instruments complement. As Spacecraft System Manager, Deputy Project Manager, and Project Manager he contributed personally to the development of various advanced design features leading to the Project's outstanding success.

NASA's two robot spacecraft, Voyager 1 and Voyager 2, were launched in the Summer of 1977 on their journeys to Jupiter of more than 625 million miles. A fitting tribute to the efforts and ingenuity of many engineers and scientists, the spacecraft have now completed the exploration of the outer Solar System. Voyager 1 reached Saturn in November 1981, and then left the Solar System. Nearly 10 years later Voyager 1 turned around to point its cameras towards Earth and took the famous Pale Blue Dot image. Voyager 2 reached Saturn in August 1981, then went on to Uranus in 1986, and Neptune in 1989.

James Watt International Medal

The presentation of the 1979 James Watt International Medal was made on Wednesday, June 25, 1980 at the Institute of Mechanical Engineers in London. The Medal was presented to Heacock, Project Manager—Voyager, Jet Propulsion Laboratory, California Institute of Technology in Pasadena, California, by the President of the Institution of Mechanical Engineers, Bryan Hildrew, C.B.E., M.Sc, D.I.C., F.Eng., F.I.Mech.E., F.I.Mar.E., who read a citation.

The James Watt International Medal is awarded biennially to an engineer of any nationality who is deemed worthy of this, the highest award which the Institution of Mechanical Engineers can bestow. The Council awarded the 1979 Medal to Heacock for his outstanding achievements as leader of the team responsible for shaping the development and execution of the technically advanced spacecraft used by the United States of America in the exploration of the outer planets of our solar system.

References

1928 births
2016 deaths
American aerospace engineers
California Institute of Technology alumni
Voyager program